This is a list of record labels owned by, or associated with Sony Music.

According to Sony Music official site, the main labels are Columbia Records, RCA Records, Epic Records, Arista Records, Legacy Recordings, Sony Music Latin, Sony Masterworks, Provident Label Group, and Sony Classical, as well as the Nashville divisions of Columbia, RCA, Epic, and Arista.

Columbia Records

30th Century Records
Alamo Records
Daft Life
Hypnotize Minds
i am OTHER
Startime International
Reach Records
Wake One

Epic Records

Dreamcatcher Company 
DC Flag Records
Battery Records
So So Def Recordings
Bad Boy Records
Vested In Culture
Freebandz
Droxzy Alliance Recording

RCA Records

RCA Inspiration
GospoCentric Records
Verity Records
ByStorm Entertainment
Nappy Boy Entertainment
Polo Grounds Music
ASAP Worldwide
Kemosabe Records
Roswell Records

Sony Music Nashville

Arista Nashville
Columbia Nashville
RCA Records Nashville

Provident Label Group

Brentwood Records
Benson Records
Essential Records
Flicker Records
Beach Street Records
Reunion Records
Provident Special Markets

Sony Masterworks

Milan Records
Playbill Records
Bluebird Records
Masterworks Broadway
Okeh Records
Portrait Records
RCA Red Seal Records
Sony Classical Records
Odyssey Records

Legacy Recordings

Legacy handles the archives of Sony Music–owned labels, including:
Columbia Records
Epic Records
RCA Records
RCA Records Nashville
J Records
Windham Hill Records
Arista Records
LaFace Records
Jive Records
Buddah Records
Kama Sutra Records
Philadelphia International Records
It also handles the catalog of recordings produced by Phil Spector on Philles Records (originally from EMI Music Publishing, which was acquired by Sony/ATV Music Publishing).

The Orchard/RED Music

Black River Entertainment
Blind Pig Records
Big Future Records
Century Media Records
Another Century Records
Inside Out Music
Cinematic Music Group
Disruptor Records
Frenchkiss Records
JDub Records
Louder Than Life (joint-venture with Salaam Remi)
Madison Gate Records (owned by Sony Pictures Entertainment)
Odd Future Records
Reach Records
Shrapnel Records
Soundx3 Records
TVT Records
Valley Entertainment
Xanadu Records

Sony Music Publishing

Associated Production Music (joint-venture with Universal Production Music)
Sonoton
Bruton Music
Cezame Music
Hard and Kosinus
EMI Production Music
KPM Musichouse
Extreme Music
Remote Control Productions
Bleeding Fingers Music
Hickory Records
Philles Records
Dial Records
Four Star Records
Challenge Records

Sony Music UK
Columbia Records UK
RCA Label Group
Epic Records UK
Relentless Records
Ministry of Sound
Music For Nations
5K Records
Black Butter Records (joint-venture)
Dream Life Records
Insanity Records (joint-venture)
Magic Star
Sony Music Masterworks
Sony Classical
Masterworks 
Masterworks Broadway 
OKeh, 
Portrait
Deutsche Harmonia Mundi
Milan 
Robots + Humans
Since ’93
Sony Commercial Group
Sony Music Nashville UK
WEAREBLK (joint-venture)
AWAL

Sony Music Entertainment Japan (Independent operation)

Aniplex
Ariola Japan
Defstar Records
Epic Records Japan
Ki/oon Music
Okeh Records
Peanuts Worldwide (39%)
SME Records
Sony Music Records
Gr8! Records
Studioseven Recordings
Time Records
Red Cafe
Sony Music Distribution
Sacra Music

Other Sony Music national companies

Arista Records
Sony Music Australia
Columbia Records
Epic Records
RCA Records
Ariola Records
Sony Music Brasil
Amigo Records
Ariola Records
Austro Music
Blast Stage Records
Inbraza
LG7
Phonomotor Records
Som Livre
SLAP
The Orchard Brasil
Sony Music Canada
Ratas Music Group
Jive Records
GUN Records
X-Cell Records
604 Records
Sony Music China
Sony Music France
Arista France
RCA Records France
Sony Music Germany
Sony Music Entertainment Hong Kong
Sony Music India
Zee Music company
Sony Music Indonesia
Sony Music Korea
GLG
Dreamcatcher Company
POP Music
Sony Music Latin
Sony Music Malaysia Sdn. Bhd.
Sony Music Mexico
Sony Music Philippines
Sony Music Entertainment Poland
Azteca Music
Sony Music Taiwan
JVR Music as distributor only
Sony Music Thailand
Love Is
Bakery Music
Sony Music Vietnam
South Africa

Sony Music Entertainment Africa/South Africa
South African Recordings
Select Records

Independent labels distributed by Sony Music Entertainment

Albert Productions
Aware Records
Black Butter Records (UK)
Black Mirror Society (The Netherlands)
Buppu Records (Japan)
Chrome Entertainment (South Korea)
Constellation Records (Canada)
Cooking Vinyl (UK)
D-town records
Danger Crue Records (Japan, 2012–present, formerly handled by Avex Group)
Deutsche Harmonia Mundi
Fair Trade Services
Hostess Entertainment (Japan)
In the Name Of
Ivory Music & Video (Philippines, 2011–2018)
J Storm (Japan)
JVR Music (Taiwan)
Kemosabe Records
Kobalt Music Group
KQ Entertainment (South Korea) 
Love Is (Thailand)
Megaforce Records
Midas Music (Brazil)
MODHAUS (South Korea) 
Mr. 305 Inc.
Napalm Records (Canada)
Nick Records 
CBS Records
 Palm Tree Records 
Pink Floyd Records (world except UK & Europe)
Shout! Factory
Starship Entertainment (South Korea)
Stmpd Rcrds (The Netherlands)
SPV GmbH (Germany)
Robbins Entertainment
Drakkar Entertainment
Tratore (Brazil)
TOP Media (South Korea)
Top Stop Music
Ultra Music
 EEM Records
Wake One (South Korea) 
Warner Music Group (SAARC/South Asian countries except Bangladesh)
WM Entertainment (South Korea)
WWE Music Group

Former/defunct labels

Columbia Records

American Recordings
Def Jam Recordings
Jam Master Jay Records
Fever Records
C2 Records
LBW Entertainment
Ruffhouse Records
Ovum Recordings
Loud Records
DIW Records
Vinyl Solution
So So Def Recordings
Skint Records
Skyblaze Recordings
Burgundy Records
Chaos Recordings
Oriole Records
Private-I Records

Epic Records

Razor Sharp Records
Cold Chillin' Records
Portrait Records
Immortal Records
550 Music
WTG Records
Work Group
Ode Records
Okeh Records
Ruthless Records
Hidden Beach Recordings
Caribou Records
Tabu Records
Jet Records
Tuff City Records
Nemperor Records
Portrait Records
Sony Wonder

Zomba Group of Companies
Battery Records
Internal Affairs
Jive Records
EBUL
Jive Electro
Volcano Entertainment
Zoo Entertainment
Scotti Brothers Records
Capricorn Records

RED Distribution
Loud Records
Ruthless Records

RCA Records

Windham Hill Records
Living Music
Private Music
Novus Records
Loud Records
RCA Camden
RCA Gold Seal
RCA Victrola

Arista Records

Rowdy Records
LaFace Records
Bad Boy Records
Profile Records
Kinetic Records
Logic Records
BMG Kidz
Jim Henson Records
Bell Records
Go-Feet Records

BMG Entertainment

ECM Records
Imago Records
V2 Records
Gee Street Records
Junior Boy's Own
Beyond Records
Milan Records
BMG Heritage
Buddah Records
Sanctuary Records
Sanctuary Urban
BMG Funhouse
Amiga
BMG Records Pilipinas
Arte Nova Classics
Conifer Records
Deutsche Schallplatten Berlin (DSB)
Hansa Records

Sony Music UK
Sony S2 (Sony Soho Square)
Silvertone Records
Phonogenic Records
United Records

Other former labels
Nick Records
Shout! Factory
Abril Music (bought from Editora Abril in 2003 by BMG and absorbed by Ariola Records.)
Jive Epic (renamed RCA Records France in 2019.)
Syco Music

See also

 Record labels owned by Sony BMG

References

Sony Music Entertainment
Record labels